Pachyodes amplificata is a moth of the family Geometridae first described by Francis Walker in 1862. It is found in China (Hubei, Hunan, Gansu, Guangxi, Anhui, Zhejiang, Fujian, Jiangxi, Sichuan).

References

Moths described in 1862
Pseudoterpnini
Moths of Asia